Clay Tallman was a Democratic politician from the U.S. State of Nevada. He was Commissioner of the United States General Land Office from 1913 to 1921. He was born May 7, 1874 at Belding, Michigan. He graduated from what is now Michigan State University in 1895.

Tallman was appointed Commissioner on May 27, 1913 by Woodrow Wilson. He was a lawyer from Nevada, and was a member of the Nevada State Senate from 1909 to 1913, serving as President pro tempore during his last session. He was also chairman of the Democratic State Central Committee of Nevada, and was his party's candidate for the United States House of Representatives in 1912.

Tallman was confirmed by the United States Senate, and was commissioned June 5, 1913. He was replaced by William Spry on March 22, 1921. He died at Montrose, Colorado August 25, 1949.

References

Nevada lawyers
General Land Office Commissioners
Democratic Party Nevada state senators
1874 births
University of Michigan Law School alumni
Michigan State University alumni
People from Belding, Michigan
1949 deaths